The 2013 Ekayana Monastery bombing was a terrorist attack that occurred in Jakarta, Indonesia on August 4, 2013 at 6:53 p.m. It targeted a Buddhist monastery named Ekayana in Jakarta. This bombing caused injuries to three people.

References

Ekayana Monastery bombing
Terrorist incidents in Indonesia
2010s in Jakarta
Crime in Jakarta
Islamic terrorism in Indonesia
Ekayana Monastery bombing
Ekayana Monastery bombing
Persecution of Buddhists
Persecution of Buddhists by Muslims